The Second Brooklyn Bridge is the second album from The Brooklyn Bridge. It was released in 1969 by Buddah Records.

Track listing
"Without Her (Father Paul)" (Lee Pockriss, Shelly Pinz) – 3:30
"Minstrel Sunday" (Jon Lind) – 3:34
"Caroline" (Bodie Chandler) – 2:39
"You'll Never Walk Alone" (Oscar Hammerstein II, Richard Rodgers) – 4:53
"Inside Out (Upside Down)" (Jimmy Rosica, Shelly Davis) – 5:55
"Echo Park/Look at Me" (Buzz Clifford)/(David Gates) – 7:01
"Your Husband-My Wife" (Irwin Levine, Toni Wine) – 3:01
"The 12:29 Is Taking My Baby Away" (Peter Lee Stirling) – 3:12
"In the End" (Tommy Sullivan) – 1:50

Personnel

Brooklyn Bridge
 Johnny Maestro – lead vocals
 Richie Macioce – guitar 
 Jimmy Rosica – bass guitar, vocals
 Carolyn Wood – organ
 Artie Cantanzarita – drums, trumpet
 Joe Ruvio – saxophone, vocals
 Shelly Davis – trumpet, piano
 Fred Ferrara – vocals, guitar, trumpet
 Les Cauchi – vocals, piano
 Mike Gregorio – vocals, piano

Technical
 Wes Farrell – producer
 Brooklyn Bridge – arrangements

References

Johnny Maestro & the Brooklyn Bridge albums
Buddah Records albums
1969 albums